Ronald Reinhold Schuler is a Canadian politician. He is currently a member of the Manitoba Legislature and a representative of the Progressive Conservative Party (PCs). He was first elected in the 1999 provincial election. and was re-elected in the 2003, 2007, 2011, 2016, and 2019 elections.

After the PCs won control of the Manitoba government in the 2016 election, Premier of Manitoba Brian Pallister appointed Schuler Minister of Crown Services. On August 17, 2017 he was named Minister of Infrastructure. On December 30, 2021 Schuler was removed from cabinet.

Personal life and education
Schuler was born in Winnipeg, Manitoba. He attended John M. King Elementary School, before moving to Benton Harbor, Michigan, where he attended Millburg Elementary School in Berrien County. In 1976, he moved back to Winnipeg, where he attended Elmwood Junior High and graduated from Elmwood High School in 1981. He is the youngest son of Wanda and Reinhold Schuler, with four sisters and one brother.

Schuler obtained a Bachelor of Arts from the University of Manitoba in 1987, with a major in international relations and a minor in sociology. He was a junior executive at the T. Eaton Company from 1979 to 1984. Schuler went on to become a small business owner, co-owning Christmas Traditions, Espresso Junction Inc., and Gingerbread World Inc. He also served as Chair of the Manitoba Intercultural Council from 1991 to 1993.

School board service
On October 25, 1995, Schuler began his political career when he was elected as a school trustee for Ward Three in the River East School Division.

1995 River East School Division Ward Three school trustee results

In his first term on the River East School Board, Schuler served as Chairman of the Education and Policy Committee. He advocated a zero violence tolerance policy on issues affecting the safety of students and staff. Schuler strongly supported increased technology funding and division-wide upgrades to classroom computers and also strongly supported heritage language programs offered in the divisions.

He was re-elected on October 28 as a school trustee for the River East School Division, Ward Three in the 1998 election. Schuler’s re-election led him to being appointed to serve as Chairman of the Board of Trustees in November 1998. He resigned from his position as school trustee on September 23, 1999 to pursue his career in provincial politics with the Progressive Conservative Party of Manitoba.

1998 River East School Division Ward Three school trustee results

Legislative service
Schuler was elected to the Legislative Assembly of Manitoba in the provincial election held on September 21, 1999, defeating New Democrat Leonard Kimakovich by 4969 votes to 4058 in the constituency of Springfield.

During Schuler’s first term as a Member of the Legislative Assembly (MLA), Gary Filmon, Leader of the Progressive Conservative Party of Manitoba, appointed Schuler as the PC Caucus Labour & Immigration Critic.

The voters of Springfield re-elected Schuler as their MLA on June 3, 2003 by a much greater margin, though the PCs incurred a net loss of four seats across Manitoba. Stuart Murray appointed Schuler as the PC Caucus Critic for Energy, Science and Technology, and the Chief Critic for the Kyoto Accord, the Civil Service Commission, and Lotteries and Gaming.

2003 Manitoba provincial election: Springfield

On February 24, 2006, Schuler announced that he would seek the leadership of the Progressive Conservative Party of Manitoba. Hugh McFadyen won the leadership election on April 29, 2006.

2006 Progressive Conservative Party of Manitoba leadership election

For a third consecutive term, Schuler was re-elected as a Member of the Legislative Assembly for Springfield on May 22, 2007.

In September 2007, Schuler was appointed Critic for Education, Citizenship and Youth, as well as Caucus Whip by Leader Hugh McFadyen. As of February 4, 2010, Schuler is the Critic for Housing and Community Development and Sports.

Schuler held several critic portfolios during his time in Opposition, including Labour and Immigration, Energy, Science and Technology, Kyoto Accord, the Civil Service Commission, Lotteries and Gaming, Education, Citizenship & Youth, Community Economic Development Fund, Housing and Community Development and Sports, as well as Caucus Whip.

Schuler was re-nominated to represent the Progressive Conservative Party in the 2011 Manitoba provincial election, held on October 4, in the newly created constituency of St. Paul and won re-election.

References

External links
 

1963 births
Living people
Politicians from Winnipeg
Canadian people of German descent
Members of the Executive Council of Manitoba
Progressive Conservative Party of Manitoba MLAs
University of Manitoba alumni
21st-century Canadian politicians